Jadugar Om Prakash Sharma (1973 – 16 October 2022), popularly known as O. P. Sharma, was an Indian magician. Sharma was born and grew up in Kanpur, Uttar Pradesh. He began performing magic at seven years old, and later completed a mechanical engineering degree. By 2018 he had performed nearly 39,000 shows, and has been aided in his act by his son.

References

1940s births
2022 deaths
Indian magicians
20th-century Indian people
People from Ballia district